Mimandria insularis is a moth of the family Geometridae first described by Charles Swinhoe in 1904. It is found on Madagascar.

References

Pseudoterpnini
Moths of Madagascar
Moths of Africa
Moths described in 1904
Taxa named by Charles Swinhoe